Laurent Bernardi (born 9 May 1988 in Ajaccio) is a French football goalkeeper.

References

1988 births
Living people
French footballers
AC Ajaccio players
Ligue 2 players
Sportspeople from Ajaccio
Association football goalkeepers
Footballers from Corsica